The Democratic National Alliance (abbreviated DNA) is a political party in The Bahamas, officially launched on 12 May 2011. The current leader of the DNA is Arinthia Komolafe, the Party's first female leader elected on 22 February 2019. Mrs. Komolafe succeeded Mr. Christopher A. Mortimer who served as Interim Leader from 24 October 2017 to 22 February 2019. He was preceded by the party's first leader and one of 13 founding members, Branville McCartney. The Party has contested two General Elections in The Bahamas in 2012 and 2017 gaining 8.5% and 4.7% of the popular vote respectively.

Senate Appointment
In December 2016, seven of the ten FNM House Members executed a vote of no confidence in then-Opposition Leader, Hubert Minnis. This was the first time that a no-confidence vote was staged in the Bahamas, against an Opposition Leader. After the seven members wrote a letter to the Governor-General on the matter, Member of Parliament for Long Island Loretta Butler-Turner was named the new Opposition Leader. Her appointment marked the first time that a woman, a Long Islander, or a person not leading the political party of which they were a member, was charged to be Leader of the Opposition. Subsequent to her appointment, Butler-Turner named then-DNA leader Branville McCartney as Leader of Opposition Business in the Bahamas Senate. This was the first time in which the DNA has been named to the upper chamber, and the first time in which a politician from one party appointed a member of a rival party to lead the Bahamas senate. After months of coalition discussions between opposition parties in advance of the 2017 elections, both Turner and McCartney in a joint Press Conference affirmed that uniting the opposition was the best plan for ousting the Progressive Liberal Party government in the impending elections. However, less than three months later, McCartney announced his resignation from the Bahamas Senate on 2 March 2017, and claimed that Loretta Butler-Turner had only "sown seeds of confusion since assuming her post, bringing no real leadership or focused ideas to the fore". In the 2017 national election; the DNA had a 43% decrease in the party's vote tally compared to their initial election performance in 2012.

Post-2017 Election 
After a brief post-mortem period following the 2017 General Elections, former DNA leader Branville McCartney announced in October 2017 that he would resign as leader of the party. Reflecting on his party's growth since 2011, McCartney thanked his supporters in his farewell address, remarking that his resignation was not "throwing it in the towel", but about "clearing a path so that other bright minds within our ranks have an opportunity to shine... so that our organization can move forward with new and fresh ideas." Shortly thereafter and as mandated by the DNA's Constitution, McCartney's former deputy Christopher Mortimer was named the interim-leader of the DNA. A Special Meeting was then called for the election of a new Deputy Leader to fill the spot left vacant by Mr. Mortimer's new appointment, ultimately being filled by Arinthia Komolafe. Komolafe was the party's 2017 Killarney candidate who had received 422 votes; approximately 7% of the total votes cast, compared to the other 2 candidates, FNM Leader and PM of the Bahamas, Dr. Hubert Alexander Minnis earned 4,186 votes for the Killarney Constituency and compared to the 1,092 votes cast for the PLP candidate; Reneika Dania Knowles for the same constituency).

Fully invested in the rebuilding process, Mortimer announced that The DNA would host its second National Convention between 22 and 23 February 2019, while also declaring that he would not run for leader of the party. The event proved to be the most competitive in the party's history with all national offices up for election - In the end, out of a total of about 80 votes, Komolafe defeated challenger Kendal Smith (former Fox Hill Candidate) by a total votes of 66 votes in favor of Arinthia Komolafe and 14 in favor of Kendal Smith, and therefore she became the first woman to lead The DNA political party. Buschme Armbrister beat out Brenda Harris-Pinder for the deputy leader spot, while DNA newcomer Omar Smith was successful over Rudy Dean in his bid for the chairman post.

Electoral results

References

External links
Official website

Political parties in the Bahamas
Political parties established in 2011
2011 establishments in the Bahamas